Sherif Pasha or Cherif Pasha may refer to:
 Mohamed Sherif Pasha
 Şerif Pasha

See also
 Ali Pasha Sherif